"Country Must Be Country Wide" is a song co-written and recorded by American country rock singer Brantley Gilbert. It was released in April 2011 as the first single from the deluxe edition of his 2010 album Halfway to Heaven.

Content
In the song, Gilbert sings about the country music fanbase, saying that it is not limited to the Southern United States. Gilbert told Taste of Country that he wrote the song while on tour with country rap artist Colt Ford and Mike Dekle. Ford told Country Weekly that, while touring through Ohio, he realized that "there are rednecks everywhere[…]I was like, 'those people are all just like us, but they just sound different.'" Gilbert added that while in Ohio, he saw a man exit a truck while dressed in a cowboy hat and boots, which inspired the first verse of the song.

Critical reception
Dan MacIntosh of Country Standard Time thought that the song "lives up to that 'up to 11' promise" that he thought was established in the songs that Gilbert wrote for Jason Aldean ("Dirt Road Anthem" and "My Kinda Party"). Kevin John Coyne of Country Universe gave the single a less favorable review, juxtaposing the song to Neal McCoy's "The City Put the Country Back in Me" and writing that "This song is about as country as "Wanted Dead or Alive" anyway.

Music video
The music video was directed by Shane Drake and premiered in mid-2011. Filmed at the Tennessee State Prison. It features in several scenes a symbol composed of Gilbert's initials.

Commercial performance
The song debuted on the Hot Country Songs chart at No. 44 for the chart date April 23, 2011, and eventually reached No. 1 on that chart on December 3, 2011. It debuted on the Billboard Hot 100 at No. 100 on July 9, 2011, eventually reaching No. 50 the same week it reach No. 1 on the Hot Country Songs chart. The song was certified Platinum by the RIAA on March 25, 2014, and reached its million sales mark in the U.S. in June 2014.

Charts and certifications

Weekly Charts

Year-end charts

Certifications

References

2011 singles
Brantley Gilbert songs
Song recordings produced by Dann Huff
Songs written by Brantley Gilbert
Big Machine Records singles
Music videos directed by Shane Drake
2010 songs
Songs written by Colt Ford